Audsley is a surname. Notable people with the surname include:

Dylan Audsley (born 1994), American rugby union player
George Ashdown Audsley (1838–1925), Scottish architect, artist, illustrator, writer, decorator and pipe organ designer 
Jack Audsley (1892–1942), Australian rules footballer
Mary Audsley (1919–2008), British painter and sculptor
Mick Audsley (born 1949), British film and television editor
Nicholas Audsley (born 1982), British actor
William Audsley (1833–1907), Scottish architect